The 2020–21 Everton F.C. (women) season was the club's fourth consecutive campaign in the FA Women's Super League, the highest level of the football pyramid. Along with competing in the WSL, the club also contested two domestic cup competitions: the FA Cup and the League Cup.

Squad

Preseason

FA Women's Super League

Results summary

Results by matchday

Results

League table

Women's FA Cup 

As a member of the top two tiers, Everton will enter the FA Cup in the fourth round proper. Originally scheduled to take place on 31 January 2021, it was delayed due to COVID-19 restrictions.

FA Women's League Cup 

Everton finished second in the group but did not qualify for the knockout stage as a best-placed runner up.

Group C

Ranking of second-placed teams

Squad statistics

Appearances 

Starting appearances are listed first, followed by substitute appearances after the + symbol where applicable.

|-
|colspan="14"|Players away from the club on loan:

|-
|colspan="14"|Players who appeared for the club but left during the season:

|}

Transfers

Transfers in

Loans in

Transfers out

Loans out

References 

Everton F.C. (women) seasons
Everton